Etaibetsu Dam  is a rockfill dam located in Hokkaido Prefecture in Japan. The dam is used for irrigation. The catchment area of the dam is 50 km2. The dam impounds about 41  ha of land when full and can store 4372 thousand cubic meters of water. The construction of the dam was started on 1953 and completed in 1967.

References

Dams in Hokkaido